The ecology of fear is a conceptual framework describing the psychological impact that predator-induced stress experienced by animals has on populations and ecosystems. Within ecology, the impact of predators has been traditionally viewed as limited to the animals that they directly kill, while the ecology of fear advances evidence that predators may have a far more substantial impact on the individuals that they predate, reducing fecundity, survival and population sizes. To avoid being killed, animals that are preyed upon will employ anti-predator defenses which aid survival but may carry substantial costs.

History 
The concept was coined in the 1999 paper "The Ecology of Fear: Optimal Foraging, Game Theory, and Trophic Interactions", which argued that "a predator [...] depletes a food patch [...] by frightening prey rather than by actually killing prey."

In the 2000s, the ecology of fear gained attention after researchers identified an impact of the reintroduction of wolves into Yellowstone on the regrowth of aspen and willows because of a substantial reduction in the numbers of elk in the park through killing. Some studies also indicated that the wolves affected the grazing intensity and patterns of the elk because they felt less secure when feeding. Critics have put forward alternative explanations for the regrowth, other than the wolf reintroduction. 

The consideration of wolves as a charismatic species and the fame of Yellowstone led to widespread media attention of the concept, including a mention in The New York Times and a fold-out illustration of the impact of wolves on Yellowstone in the March 2010 edition of the National Geographic. There has also been a popular YouTube video How Wolves Change Rivers, which has been described as a vast overstatement by some scientists.

A 2010 study found that sharks, like wolves, may have the capacity to create an ecology of fear in the ecosystems which they inhabit. In 2012, a study indicated that the ecology of fear may also be applicable to parasites, with evidence suggesting that animals abandon feeding both because of predator and parasite avoidance.

Some critics of the concept argue that the "cognitive and emotional aspects of avoiding predation remain unknown" and that this is true for "virtually all studies of 'the ecology of fear'".

Landscape of fear 
The landscape of fear is a model based on the ecology of fear, which asserts that the behaviour of animals that are preyed upon is shaped by psychological maps of their geographical surroundings which accounts for the risk of predation in certain areas.

Relationship to post-traumatic stress disorder 
A 2011 paper described how exposure to predators as life-threatening psychological stressors is used in animal models of post-traumatic stress disorder (PTSD); these models are also used to emulate the experience of PTSD in humans and the authors suggested a collaboration between ecologists and neuroscientists to study the "neurological effects of predator-induced fear and stress in animals in the wild."

In 2019, a study identified lasting effects on behavior and PTSD-like changes in the brains of wild animals caused by fear-inducing interactions with predators.

Human impact 
Studies have found that the fear of humans can have substantial impacts on animal behaviour, including on top predators such as pumas. Humans may also create an ecology of fear by reintroducing predators into areas where they no longer live; the moral philosopher Oscar Horta argues against such reintroductions, asserting that they conflict with the well-being and interests of the animals already living in the environment.

See also

References

Further reading 
 
 

Animal ecology
Animal welfare
Ecology terminology
Ethology
Landscape ecology
Predation
Wild animal suffering